D. Barry Gibbons (December 8, 1929 – March 26, 1998) was an American politician from Pennsylvania who served as a Republican member of the Pennsylvania House of Representatives for Delaware County from 1961 to 1962.

Early life and education
Gibbons graduated from Upper Darby High School.  He received an A.B. from Villanova University in 1951 and a LL.B. from Villanova University School of Law in 1956.  He served in the United States Air Force during the Korean War from 1951 to 1953.

Career
Gibbons was an attorney and partner in the law firm of Reed and Gibbons.  He was elected to the Pennsylvania House of Representatives for Delaware County and served from 1961 to 1962.

Personal life
Gibbons is interred at the St. Francis de Sales Church Cemetery in Lenni, Pennsylvania.

References

External links

1929 births
1998 deaths
20th-century American politicians
Burials in Pennsylvania
United States Air Force personnel of the Korean War
Republican Party members of the Pennsylvania House of Representatives
Pennsylvania lawyers
People from Upper Darby Township, Pennsylvania
 
20th-century American lawyers
Villanova University School of Law alumni